was a prominent daimyō in Japanese Sengoku-period. 
He was the 21st chief of the Chōsokabe clan of Tosa Province (present-day Kōchi Prefecture), the ruler of Shikoku region.

Early life and rise
He was the son and heir of Chōsokabe Kunichika and his mother was a daughter of the Saitō clan of Mino Province. His childhood name was Yasaburō (弥三郎). He is said to have been born in Okō Castle in the Nagaoka district of Tosa. 
Motochika was a quiet youth and his father was said to have fretted about the boy's gentle nature (he seems to have been nicknamed Himewako, or 'Little Princess'); Kunichika's worries evaporated when Motochika later proved himself a skilled and brave warrior.
When Motochika came of age, his father had already begun to draw away from the Ichijō, and Motochika would carry on his work.

In 1560, at the Battle of Tonomoto, Chōsokabe Kunichika captured Nagahama castle from the Motoyama clan. In response to this, Motoyama Shigetoki departed Asakura castle with 2,500 men to take the castle back. Kunichika intercepted him with 1,000 troops near Nagahama castle. This battle is noted for being Chōsokabe Motochika's first battle, in which he fought bravely, greatly impressing his father and his retainers.

In the 1562, Chōsokabe Motochika attacked Asakura castle defeated Motoyama Shigetoki and by forming alliances with local families, Motochika was able to build his power base on the Kōchi plain.

In 1569, while being careful to remain ostensibly loyal to the Ichijō over the next few years, Motochika's power grew to the extent that he was strong enough to march on the rival Aki clan of east Tosa with 7,000 men, He defeated Aki Kunitora at Battle of Yanagare, then went on to take Aki Castle. 

In the course of the decade he was awarded the court rank Ministry of Imperial Household (Kunai shō) and was sufficiently confident after the reduction of the Aki to finally turn on the Ichijō.

Unification of Shikoku

In 1573, While still lord of the Hata district of Tosa, Ichijō Kanesada was unpopular and had already suffered the defection of a number of important retainers. Seizing the opportunity, Motochika wasted no time in marching on the Ichijō's headquarters at Nakamura, and Kanesada fled to Bungo, defeated. 

In 1575, at the Battle of Shimantogawa (Battle of Watarigawa), he defeated the Ichijo family.
Thus he ended up gaining control of Tosa Province. 

Following his conquest of Tosa, Motochika turned north and prepared for an invasion of Iyo province. The lord of that province was Kōno Michinao, a daimyo who had once been driven from his domain by the Utsunomiya clan, returning only with the assistance of the powerful Mōri clan. However, it was unlikely that Kōno could count on that sort of help again as the Mōri were embroiled in a war with Oda Nobunaga. Nonetheless, Chōsokabe's campaign in Iyo did not go off without a hitch. 

In 1579, 7,000-man Chōsokabe army, commanded by Kumu Yorinobu, met the forces of Doi Kiyonaga at the Battle of Mimaomote. In the ensuing battle, Kumu was killed and his army defeated, though the loss proved little more than an unfortunate delay. The next year, Motochika led some 30,000 men into Iyo Province, and forced Kōno to flee to Bungo province. 

With little interference from either the Mōri or the Ōtomo, Chōsokabe was free to press onwards, and in 1582, he stepped up ongoing raids into Awa province and defeated Sogō Masayasu and the Miyoshi clan at the Battle of Nakatomigawa. 

Later, Motochika advanced to Sanuki province defeated Sengoku Hidehisa at Battle of Hiketa. By 1583, Chōsokabe forces had subdued both Awa and Sanuki. 
Over the ensuing decade, he extended his power to all of Shikoku island, making Motochika's dream of ruling all of Shikoku a reality.

Conflict with Hideyoshi

In 1584, Toyotomi Hideyoshi won a political victory against Tokugawa Ieyasu, securing his position as paramount warlord. Hideyoshi began expanding his rule from outside his base in central Honshu and decided to invade Shikoku.

In 1585, Toyotomi Hideyoshi launched an attack against Chōsokabe Motochika, and seized Shikoku island, the smallest of Japan's four main islands.

Shikoku campaign

In 1585, Toyotomi forces invaded Shikoku island with a force of 113,000 men, led by Ukita Hideie, Kobayakawa Takakage, Kikkawa Motoharu, Hashiba Hidenaga, and Hashiba Hidetsugu against 40,000 soldiers of the Chōsokabe clan. 
Despite the overwhelming size of Hideyoshi's army, Chōsokabe chose to fight to defend his territories. The battles culminated in the siege of Ichinomiya Castle, which lasted for 26 days.
Motochika surrendered, and forfeited Awa, Sanuki, and Iyo Provinces; Hideyoshi permitted him to retain Tosa.

Service under Hideyoshi
Under Hideyoshi, in 1587 Motochika and his son Nobuchika participated in the invasion of neighboring Kyūshū in which Nobuchika died at Battle of Hetsugigawa. In 1590, Motochika led a fleet in the Siege of Shimoda and Siege of Odawara, and also fought in the Japanese invasions of Korea in 1592.

In 1596, the Spanish ship San Felipe was wrecked in Chōsokabe territory while en route from Manila to Acapulco. Motochika seized the cargo of the ship, and the incident escalated all the way up to Hideyoshi, leading to the crucifixion of 26 Christians in Nagasaki, the first lethal persecution of Christians by the state in Japan.

Death

Motochika died in 1599 at age 60 at his mansion in Fushimi. His successor was Chōsokabe Morichika.
In addition to his leadership, Motochika is remembered for his '100-Article Code of the Chōsokabe' and his struggle to found an economically strong castle town, moving in the course of his career from Oko to Otazaka and on to Urado.

Family
Father: Chōsokabe Kunichika (1504–1560)
Mother: Daughter of the Saitō clan
Younger Brother
Kira Chikasada (1541–1576), Kunichika's second son. Shared his first battle with his eldest brother, Motochika, at Nagahama. Adopted into Kira clan on brother's orders and became a family retainer. Helped his brother's fight against the Ichijo clan until he died of illness in 1576.
Kōsokabe Chikayasu (1543–1593), Kunichika's third son. He was adopted by Kōsokabe Chikahide from Kōsokabe clan
Shima Chikamasu (d. 1571), Kunichika's fourth son. Became a part of the Shima clan to appease demands for an heir. Known as a brave warrior who fought in Motochika's campaign to quell the Motoyama clan.
Wife: Lady Motochika (died 1583)
 Concubine: Koshōshō, or Lady Ōgata
Sons:
 Chōsokabe Nobuchika (1565–1587) by Lady Motochika
 Kagawa Chikakazu (1567–1587) by Lady Motochika
 Tsuno Chikatada (1572–1600) by Lady Motochika
 Chōsokabe Morichika (1575–1615) by Lady Motochika
 Chōsokabe Ukondaifu (1583-1615) by Lady Ogata
 Chōsokabe Yasutoyo (born 1599)
Daughters:
 Unknown daughter (wife of Ichijō Tadamasa) by Lady Motochika
 Akohime (wife of Satake Chikanao) by Lady Motochika
 Unknown daughter (wife of Kira Chikazane) by Lady Motochika
 Unknown daughter (wife of Yoshimatsu Jūzaemon) by Lady Motochika

In popular culture

In the 1949 Mexican film Philip of Jesus, the character Prince Chokozabe (sic) is played by Rodolfo Acosta.

He is a playable character in Pokémon Conquest (Pokémon + Nobunaga's Ambition in Japan), with his partner Pokémon being Dewott and Samurott.

Motochika is a playable character from Samurai Warriors 2 Xtreme Legends onwards, where he wields a shamisen, he continuously calls himself as "The Bat King", due to Nobunaga historically referring to him as a "the bat who refuses to fly away from its home".

Motochika is also a playable character in the Sony PlayStation game, Sengoku Basara where he wields an anchor and appears as a pirate. He also appears in the anime adaptation of the game Sengoku Basara: Samurai Kings.

He is also a playable character in several Koei strategy games, as a selectable warlord in Nobunaga's Ambition series, and as a unlockable character in Taikou Risshiden IV and V.

He is a playable warlord in Total War:Shogun 2.

References 

 新井政義（編集者）『日本史事典』。東京：旺文社 1987 (p. 263)

1539 births
1599 deaths
Daimyo
Chōsokabe clan
People from Kōchi Prefecture